Kamla Verma (1928 – 8 June 2021)  was an Indian politician who served three terms as a member of the Haryana Legislative Assembly for Yamunanagar (1977–1981, 1987–1991 and 1996–2000).

Biography

Verma was born in Gujranwala (now in Punjab, Pakistan). She studied Ayurveda and was associated with Arya Samaj before entering politics. She was president of state unit of Bharatiya Janata Party (BJP)(1980-1983)  and earlier of Jan Sangh. Verma was imprisoned for 19 months during "The Emergency". She served as cabinet minister in the ministries headed by Devi Lal.

Verma died due to COVID-19–associated mucormycosis on 8 June 2021 at a private hospital in Jagadhri, Haryana.

References

1928 births
2021 deaths
Members of the Haryana Legislative Assembly
People from Yamunanagar
Indians imprisoned during the Emergency (India)
Bharatiya Jana Sangh politicians
State cabinet ministers of Haryana
Arya Samajis
Bharatiya Janata Party politicians from Haryana
People from Gujranwala District
20th-century Indian women politicians
Deaths from the COVID-19 pandemic in India
20th-century Indian politicians
Deaths from mucormycosis
Women members of the Haryana Legislative Assembly